Soul Sacrifice may refer to:

 "Soul Sacrifice" (song), a 1969 instrumental by Santana
 Soul Sacrifice (video game), a 2013 video game